California Proposition 92 was Californian ballot proposition that voters rejected on February 5, 2008. It was a state initiative that would have amended Proposition 98, which set a mandate for the minimum level of funding each year for elementary and secondary schools and for the California Community Colleges.

Proposal
Proposition 92 would have established a system of independent public community college districts and Board of Governors within the framework of the California Constitution.  A minimum level of state funding for school districts and community college districts would have been calculated separately from the current K-14 education budget.  Additionally, 10.46 percent of current Proposition 98 school funding maintenance would have been allocated to community colleges.  Furthermore, community college fees would have froze at $15/unit per semester and limit future increase based upon a devised formula.  Other associated budgetary allocations earmarked for the current K-14 system would also have been divided accordingly.

Proposition was projected to amount to an increase in state spending on K–14 education from 2007–08 through 2009–10—averaging about $300 million per year, with unknown impacts annually thereafter.  The loss of student fee revenues would have been potentially about $70 million annually.  Currently, student fees of $20/unit, go to the general fund, not to the community college where the student is enrolled.

Results

References

External links
Yes on 92
No on 92
California Voter Information Guide of Proposition 92
ABC7.com: Prop 92 defeated

2008 California ballot propositions
Failed amendments to the Constitution of California
Initiatives in the United States